The 2021 President's Cup was a professional tennis tournament played on outdoor hard courts. It was the fifteenth and twelfth editions of the tournament which were part of the 2021 ATP Challenger Tour and the 2021 ITF Women's World Tennis Tour. It took place in Nur-Sultan, Kazakhstan between 12 and 18 July 2021.

Men's singles main-draw entrants

Seeds

 1 Rankings are as of 28 June 2021.

Other entrants
The following players received wildcards into the singles main draw:
  Grigoriy Lomakin
  Dostanbek Tashbulatov
  Beibit Zhukayev

The following players received entry from the qualifying draw:
  Yan Bondarevskiy
  Artem Dubrivnyy
  Oleksii Krutykh
  Andrey Kuznetsov

Women's singles main-draw entrants

Seeds

 1 Rankings are as of 28 June 2021.

Other entrants
The following players received wildcards into the singles main draw:
  Gozal Ainitdinova
  Yekaterina Dmitrichenko
  Lina Glushko
  Zhibek Kulambayeva

The following players received entry using protected rankings:
  Hiroko Kuwata
  Peangtarn Plipuech
  Sabina Sharipova
  Valeriya Yushchenko

The following players received entry from the qualifying draw:
  Nigina Abduraimova
  Jacqueline Cabaj Awad
  Angelina Gabueva
  Justina Mikulskytė
  Viktória Morvayová
  Ekaterina Shalimova
  Anna Sisková
  Anastasia Tikhonova

Champions

Men's singles

  Max Purcell def.  Jay Clarke 3–6, 6–4, 7–6(8–6).

Women's singles

 Mariam Bolkvadze def.  Valeria Savinykh, 4–6, 6–3, 6–2

Men's doubles

  Hsu Yu-hsiou /  Benjamin Lock def.  Peter Polansky /  Sergiy Stakhovsky 2–6, 6–1, [10–7].

Women's doubles

  Alina Charaeva /  Maria Timofeeva def.  Evgeniya Levashova /  Laura Pigossi, 7–6(7–5), 2–6, [10–6]

References

External links
 2021 President's Cup at ITFtennis.com
 Official website

President's Cup (tennis)
2021 ATP Challenger Tour
2021 ITF Women's World Tennis Tour
2021 in Kazakhstani sport
July 2021 sports events in Asia